Afro-Saudis are Saudi people of Black African heritage. Afro-Saudis are the largest Afro-Arab group. They are spread all around the country but are mostly found in the major cities of Saudi Arabia. Afro-Saudis speak Arabic and adhere to Islam. Their origins date back centuries ago to African Muslim migrants settling in Saudi Arabia, and to the Arab slave trade.

History

Arabia and Africa have been in contact starting with the obsidian exchange networks of the 7th millennium BC. These networks were strengthened by the rise of Egyptian dynasties of the 4th millennium BC. Anthropologists have indicated the likely existence of settlements in Arabia, from the people of the Horn of Africa, as early as the 3rd and 2nd millenniums BC.

Population
In 2021, their population is 3,500,000, or 10% of Saudi Arabia’s 35,000,000 people.

Social condition
Unlike in the Americas of the 19th century, slaves in the Middle East were allowed to own land and their children were generally not born into slavery. However, also unlike in the Americas, males slaves were all castrated and the women were all used as sex slaves. Also conversion to Islam precluded further servitude and gave freedom. Skin color played a distinctive role even amongst slaves. Many activists amongst Afro-Saudis complain that they are not given media representation and are unable to find opportunities to improve their social condition.

Notable Afro-Saudis
Majed Abdullah
Adil al-Kalbani
Tareg Hamedi
Hawsawi family
Mohammed Hussein Al Amoudi
Muhammad Saad al-Beshi
Fahad Al-Muwallad
Mohamed Kanno
Etab

See also
 Slavery in Saudi Arabia

References 

Saudi Arabian people
Ethnic groups in Saudi Arabia
Saudi Arabian people of African descent
African diaspora in the Middle East
African diaspora in the Arab world